HTC Global Services, established in 1990 and headquartered in Troy, Michigan is a provider of information technology and business process services.

History 
HTC Global Services Inc., was founded in 1990 by Indian entrepreneur, Madhava Reddy, as a Michigan, USA based privately owned information technology and business process outsourcing services company and currently has centers in Chennai, Hyderabad and Bengaluru in India. Madhava Reddy is the President and CEO of the company. Currently the company has 11,000 employees globally including from Ciber and CareTech, which it has acquired in 2017 and 2014 respectively.

In 2018,the company had invested ₹100 crore (100million Indian rupees) in a 4,500-seat development center located in Vandalur, to the south of Chennai which will support the company's IT operations and business process outsourcing growth. In India it has centers in Chennai and Hyderabad with other places of operations being Michigan (US), Singapore, Australia, Middle-East and Malaysia.

Acquisitions 
In 2014, the company acquired CareTech Solutions, a US based Healthcare IT services provider. CareTech now operates as a wholly owned subsidiary of HTC and provides IT services primarily to the Healthcare providers in USA. In May 2017, HTC Global Services acquired Ciber which is a global information technology consulting, services and outsourcing company for 93 million US dollars, headquartered in Greenwood Village, Colorado, US.

In 2021, HTC Global Services unified its subsidiaries CareTech and Ciber under one company name, HTC Global Services.

Services 

The company deals in application services, application maintenance and support services, mobile applications, Artificial Intelligence, digital transformation, data management and analytics, and ERP, EGrAMS, HTC CMS. HTC also deals in content digitization, eBook conversion, and back office services.

In 2022, HTC partnered with Guidewire as a Consulting Select partner for the Americas to help insurers adapt to a rapidly changing industry.

In 2021, HTC partnered with Informatica as its value-added distributor for the India market to accelerate digital transformation through cloud adoption.

In September 2018, company had inked a pact with Automation Anywhere, a developer of robotic process automation software based in California, to further boost HTC's RPA (robotic process automation) services, by building BOT-based industry-specific solutions with cognitive abilities.

It had developed software service offers and product developments for sectors in the field of analytics, mobility, infrastructure services and emerging technologies and its global clients include JP Morgan, Canon, Reserve Bank of India, Bank of America, MRF and Electronics Corporation of Tamil Nadu.

Products 
The company offers grant management software that automates the grant management process. HTC has installed Enterprise Grants Management System (EGrAMS)  for various states and state agencies in USA. HTC also provides CMS platform designed for healthcare organizations and web-based and hosted hardware solution, iDoc™ for content management.

HTC is a Tier 2 investment partner of Kuali Foundation to develop and deliver next-generation library management system for various universities.

Awards and recognition 

 In 2021, HTC was profiled in the Novarica Market Navigator™ IT Services Providers for Insurers 2021 as one of the major IT services providers to North American insurers
 In 2019, HTC's EGrAMS was recognized in the 2019 Gartner Market Guide for U.S. State and Local Grant Management Solutions
 In 2018, HTC was listed in CRN's 2018 Solution Provider 500, the list of top solution providers in North America, ranked by revenue 
 In 2017, HTC was listed in CRN's 2017 Solution Provider 500, the list of top solution providers in North America, ranked by revenue 
 In 2015, HTC awarded the Salute to Diversity Award by the Corp! magazine in 2015 
 In 2011 HTC was listed in the 2011 Global Services 100: Defining Leadership in Global IT and Business Process Outsourcing (GS100: 2011 Global Services Compendium) 
 In 2010, HTC was listed in the Crain's List: Private 200 in 2010 (Crain’s Detroit Business) 
 HTC was listed as a 5-Time Honorees in the Inc. 500 Hall of Fame

See also 

 List of IT consulting firms
 List of public listed software companies of India
 Information technology in India
 List of IT consulting firms
 List of Indian IT companies

References 

Software companies established in 1990
Outsourcing companies
International information technology consulting firms
Companies based in Troy, Michigan